The Comptroller General of the Exchequer was a position in the Exchequer of HM Treasury between 1834 and 1866. The Comptroller General had responsibility for authorising the issue of public monies from the Treasury to government departments.

The post was created in the Act to Regulate the Office of the Receipt of his Majesty's Exchequer of 1834, coming into effect on 11 October that year. The position merged several offices of the Exchequer together, including that of Teller of the Receipt of the Exchequer. The Comptroller General was given custody of all the records of the Exchequer of Receipt, including standard weights and measures and standard pieces of gold, silver, and copper. The inaugural Comptroller was Sir John Newport, 1st Baronet, who was replaced on 18 April 1835 by Thomas Spring Rice, 1st Baron Monteagle of Brandon, who also served as Chancellor of the Exchequer. Lord Monteagle retained the role after he left the Cabinet in 1839, despite Lord Howick's strong opposition to the maintenance of the office.

The holder of the position received the generous salary of £2,000 per year, and the office became widely seen as an extravagant and unnecessary role. Its retention was criticised by Henry Liddell in a speech in the Commons in 1840. By the 1860s Monteagle differed from the government regarding the Exchequer control over the Treasury, and the abolition of the old exchequer was already determined upon when he died in early 1866. The post was abolished by the Exchequer and Audit Departments Act 1866 by which its duties were merged with those of the Commissioners of Audit, creating the position of Comptroller and Auditor General.

Comptrollers General of the Exchequer

References

Comptrollers General of the Exchequer
Exchequer offices
Government accounting officials
HM Treasury